The Pleasant Point Museum and Railway is a heritage railway located in the small country town of Pleasant Point in southern Canterbury, New Zealand, inland from Timaru.

History

Its main terminal is located at Pleasant Point station, which was an important stop on the Fairlie branch railway. For just over a year from 24 December 1875, Pleasant Point was actually the terminus of the line as construction further inland proceeded, and upon completion of the line, it functioned as a typical country station until closure of the Fairlie Branch came on 2 March 1968. After the line closed, a historical society was formed with the aim of preserving Pleasant Point station, as the original building from 1875 still stood, with the addition of a 1930s booking office.

Motive power
Motive power at the Pleasant Point Railway includes:

AB 699: a tender steam locomotive from 1922
D 16: a tank locomotive from 1878
TR 18: a diesel shunter from 1936
A PWD Ruston and Hornsby diesel shunter built in 1955.
An RM class Model T Ford railcar replica

The Model T Ford railcar is a replica of an experimental railcar built in 1925 and scrapped in the 1930s.  It is a significant rarity - one other replica of a Model T Ford railcar exists in the United States but it was built to different specifications.  The unique nature of the railcar has enhanced the popularity of the Railway and it runs multiple trips on operating days.  Trains run during the summer and at other holiday periods. Rolling stock includes New Zealand's only "half birdcage" passenger carriage, which dates from 1895. The ex-NZR locomotives, AB 699, D 16, and TR 18 (TMS TR 62) are all regularly operated.

The Museum includes historic railway memorabilia and vintage computers, and the society also operates an Old Time Movie Theatre.

See also
Railway preservation in New Zealand

References

Citations

Bibliography

External links
Pleasant Point Museum and Railway
Article about the development of the Railway

Heritage railways in New Zealand
Rail transport in Canterbury, New Zealand
History of Canterbury, New Zealand
Museums in Canterbury, New Zealand
Railway museums in New Zealand
3 ft 6 in gauge railways in New Zealand